Thomas Rolph may refer to:

 Thomas Rolph (1885–1956), American politician, representative from California
 Thomas Rolph (cricketer) (1840–1876), Canadian-born cricketer and lawyer, son of George Rolph